Lithium sulfite, or lithium sulphite, is an ionic compound with the formula Li2SO3.

Lithium compounds
Sulfites